The Ascot Brick Works is a heritage listed former brick works located in Ascot, Western Australia. The brick works were constructed between 1929 and 1950 and used by Bristile until they ceased operations at the site in 1982.

History 
Pottery works were established at the site on Grandstand Road opposite Ascot Racecourse in 1910 by Piercy and Pitman. This company was taken over in 1930 by H L Brisbane & Co. At the time of the takeover by H L Brisbane & Co, the site had two kilns fired by wood and coal. In 1934, two new kilns were built by Ernie Banks at the site, followed by additions to the pipe and tile factories. In 1938, the business became H L Brisbane & Wunderlich Ltd.

During the 1950s, extensions were carried out to the pipe and tile factories. In 1963, a major development of the pipe factory occurred, which was opened by Premier Charles Court on 12 December. In 1978, the second plant was converted to roof tile production. In 1982, Bristle's clay pipe division shut down.

Current situation 
The buildings are in poor structural condition, and their associated equipment has disappeared. The site has been assessed by the Australian Heritage commission and is on the Register of the National Estate.
In September 2022 the McGowan Government announced the successful contractor to undertake conservation works to the heritage listed Ascot Kilns and Chimney Stacks. Work is expected to be completed by the end of 2023.

References 

Brickworks in Australia
Manufacturing plants in Australia
Ascot, Western Australia
State Register of Heritage Places in the City of Belmont